The Juba weaver (Ploceus dichrocephalus), also known as Salvadori's weaver, is a species of bird in the family Ploceidae.
It is found in the Horn of Africa.

References

Juba weaver
Birds of the Horn of Africa
Juba weaver
Taxonomy articles created by Polbot